The Polar Express: Original Motion Picture Soundtrack is the soundtrack to the animated film of the same name, released on November 2, 2004 by Warner Sunset Records and Reprise Records.

The song, "Believe", written by Glen Ballard and Alan Silvestri, was nominated for Best Original Song at the 77th Academy Awards. It was sung at the 77th Academy Awards show by original performer Josh Groban with Beyoncé. It gained a Grammy Award in 2006.

The album was certified Gold by the RIAA in November 2007.  Having sold 724,000 copies in the United States, it is the best-selling film soundtrack/holiday album hybrid since Nielsen SoundScan started tracking music sales in 1991.

It is worth noting, that most of the original orchestral score featured in the film was not released on the official soundtrack, and has never been officially released. The soundtrack mostly comprises only songs featured in the film. A limited number of promotional "For Your Consideration" CDs, intended to showcase the film's score to reviewers of the film, were released in 2005. This CD contained nearly the complete score, but none of the film's songs. Various bootleg versions of the soundtrack, combining both the official soundtrack album and the orchestral-only CD, have since surfaced.

Track listing

Certifications

See also
 List of Billboard Top Holiday Albums number ones of the 2000s

References

External links
 http://www.discogs.com/Various-The-Polar-Express-Original-Motion-Picture-Soundtrack/release/4008442
 https://itunes.apple.com/br/album/polar-express-soundtrack-from/id27560427
 http://www.lastfm.com.br/music/The+Polar+Express+Soundtrack/The+Polar+Express+-+Original+Motion+Picture+Soundtrack

2004 soundtrack albums
2000s film soundtrack albums
Reprise Records soundtracks
Warner Records soundtracks
Alan Silvestri soundtracks
Adventure film soundtracks